Novy Byt is a rural locality (a selo) in Kakhovsky Selsoviet of Romnensky District, Amur Oblast, Russia. The population was 144 as of 2018. There are 2 streets.

Geography 
Novy Byt is located left bank of the Tom River, 38 km north of Romny (the district's administrative centre) by road. Shiroky Log is the nearest rural locality.

References 

Rural localities in Romnensky District